The 1988 Kentucky Derby was the 114th running of the Kentucky Derby. The race took place on May 7, 1988, with 137,694 people in attendance.

Let me take you back to May 7, 1988, the exact day that jockey Gary Stevens and Winning Colors won the Kentucky derby. Winning colors became the only third filly in history to win the Kentucky derby. Also winning colors was inducted into the racing hall of fame in 2000. Some people saw winning colors as an unlikely candidate to end the streak, even though it was clear that she had the talent to win the Kentucky derby.

Gary Stevens 
Gary was born on March 6,1963 in Caldwell Idaho. Stevens was one of the great tactical riders of his generation. He had the record of 5,000 career wins including the Kentucky derby. Stevens also raced in England and France. In 2005 Stevens retired and worked as racing analyst, and a jockey agent. Gary pursued a career in acting. He played the part of legendary jockey George Woolf in 2003.

Full results

Payout

 $2 Exacta: (8-1) Paid $63.40

References

1988
Kentucky Derby
Derby
Kentucky
Kentucky Derby